"We Can Breathe in Space, They Just Don't Want Us to Escape" is a song by the band Enter Shikari. The release of the single is the only release of Enter Shikari in 2008. The single was not released on the band's album, Common Dreads, in 2009, as it was decided by the band that it would be a "go-between" Take to the Skies and Common Dreads.

The song was originally demoed by the band in 2006. The reason of the re-recording was because of many requests from fans to have this song re-recorded. It is also noted that it became popular amongst fans due to P2P and File sharing sites.

The single was released digitally on 2 November 2008, with the physical formats to be released on 3 November 2008.  All physical formats are limited to 1000 copies.

Music video
The music video features the band performing the song wrapped up in tinfoil suits.  The video was shot on location in The 'Low, St Albans (the back of Chris Batten's house) and was directed by Alex Smith who also directed the video for "Jonny Sniper"

Track listing

White 7" vinyl

Clear 7" remix vinyl

Chart performance

Personnel
Roughton "Rou" Reynolds - Vocals, Electronics and Steel Guitar
Liam "Rory" Clewlow - Guitar, Backing Vocals
Chris Batten - Bass, Vocals
Rob Rolfe - Drums

References

External links
 Demo - "We Can Breathe In Space..." demo.
 Live Video - A live video recorded in 2006.

2008 singles
Enter Shikari songs
2008 songs